is a Japanese actor, best known for his role as Kouta Kazuraba, the main character of the Kamen Rider series Kamen Rider Gaim. He was the winner of the Junon Super Boy Contest 2011.

Biography
From an early age, Sano took part in the Junon Super Boy Contest. In November 2011, as a college student, he was awarded the Grand Prix from among 13,228 applicants in the same contest.

In February 2012, he made his acting debut in the theatre play Sakura. He has appeared in TV dramas and variety shows. Sano appeared in Geinō-kai tokugi-ō kettei-sen Teppen and All-Star Thanksgiving. In 2012 he was the winner of the sports competition reality television show 'Kyūkyoku no otoko wa dareda? Saikyō Sports danshi chōjō kessen.

In the same year, he starred in the Kamen Rider series Kamen Rider Gaim'', which was Sano's first main role in a TV drama.

Filmography

TV series

Films

References

External links
  
  
  

1992 births
Living people
Japanese male film actors
Japanese male television actors
Actors from Aichi Prefecture
Kamen Rider
20th-century Japanese male actors
21st-century Japanese male actors